The 2017 PowerShares QQQ 300 was the 1st race of the 2017 NASCAR Xfinity Series season and the 36th iteration of the event. The race was held on Saturday, February 25, 2017 in Daytona Beach, Florida at Daytona International Speedway, a 2.5 miles (4.0 km) permanent triangular-shaped superspeedway. The race was extended from the scheduled 120 laps to 124 laps due to NASCAR overtime. Roush Fenway Racing driver Ryan Reed took the lead on the final overtime restart and led the final two laps to earn the victory. It was Reed's first win of the season, and the second of his career. To fill out the podium, Kasey Kahne finished 2nd and Austin Dillon finished 3rd.

Background 

Daytona International Speedway is one of three superspeedways to hold NASCAR races, the other two being Indianapolis Motor Speedway and Talladega Superspeedway. The standard track at Daytona International Speedway is a four-turn superspeedway that is 2.5 miles (4.0 km) long. The track's turns are banked at 31 degrees, while the front stretch, the location of the finish line, is banked at 18 degrees.

Entry list 
 (R) denotes rookie driver.
 (i) denotes driver who is ineligible for series driver points.

Practice

First practice 
The first practice session was held on Friday, February 24, 2017 at 1:00 PM EST.

Second and final practice 
The final practice session took place on Friday, February 24, 2017, at 3:05 PM EST.

Qualifying
Qualifying took place at 10:30 AM EST. Since Daytona International Speedway is at least , the qualifying system was a single car, single lap, two round system where in the first round, everyone would set a time to determine positions 13-40. Then, the fastest 12 qualifiers would move on to the second round to determine positions 1-12.

Morgan Shepherd, Mike Harmon, Stephen Leicht, and Mark Thompson failed to qualify.

Full starting lineup

Race results
Stage One
Laps: 30

Stage Two
Laps: 30

Final Stage Results 

Laps: 60

Race statistics 
 Lead changes: 23 among 7 different drivers
 Cautions/Laps: 10 for 42
 Time of race: 2 hours, 38 minutes, and 47 seconds
 Average speed:

References 

NASCAR races at Daytona International Speedway
2017 in sports in Florida
PowerShares QQQ 300
2017 NASCAR Xfinity Series